Diyala Governorate or Diyala Province is a governorate in northeastern Iraq.

Provincial government 
Governor: Muthanna al-Tamimi
Deputy Governor: Mohammed Jassim al-Jubouri

Council

Geography 

Diyala Governorate extends to the northeast of Baghdad as far as the Iranian border. Its capital is Baqubah. It covers an area of 17,685 square kilometres (6,828 sq mi).

A large portion of the province is drained by the Diyala River, a major tributary of the Tigris. Because of its proximity to two major sources of water, Diyala's main industry is agriculture, primarily dates grown in large groves. The province also contains one of the largest olive groves in the Middle East. It is also recognized as the orange capital of the Middle East. The Hamrin Mountains pass through the governorate.

Population 
The city is home to a diverse population of Arabs,  Kurds and Turkmens.  According to the latest statistics, the number of inhabitants is approximately 1,6 million.

Administrative districts

Diyala Governorate comprises six districts, listed below with their areas and populations as estimated in 2003:

Cities, towns, and villages 
 Baqubah (provincial capital)
Nahrawan
 Muqdadiyah
 Hebheb
 Khanaqin
 Balad Ruz
 Al Khalis
 Bani sa'ad
 Jalawla (or Jalula)
 Al-Sadiyah
 Camp Ashraf
 Dwelah
 Kingirban
 Marfu Village
 Village of Nye
 Udame
 Al Mansouryah
 Kan’aan
 Al Wajehiya
 Al Muntheriya
 Abu Saydah
 Buhriz
 Mandali
 Qaryat Imam ʽAskar
 Kifri
 Qara Tapa

Infrastructure 
The Diyala Province boasts the Diyala Media Center which has one of the Middle East's tallest radio and television antennas at 349 metres (1,047 ft). The Diyala Media Center was built under contract by a Japanese architectural firm in 1989. It is one of Iraq's few independent radio and television stations that offer local television and radio news coverage as well as rebroadcasting state-run television.

Civil unrest/Iraq war 
There is evidence that Al-Qaeda in Iraq moved its base of operations from Anbar province to Diyala in 2006 and during late 2006, Baqubah and much of the Diyala province were reported to have come under Sunni insurgent control.
This insurgent control is reported to have continued through 2007 and into early 2008.

On May 11, 2007, Army Maj. Gen. Benjamin Mixon, commander of the Multination Division North said he needed more troops in order to contain the current level of violence in the Diyala province, this coming in the recent wake of a troop "surge", involuntary recalls by the U.S. military, and the public debate about the level of commitment from the U.S. government.
By mid-2007 the Islamic State of Iraq, already holding Baqubah and most of the province under its control, declared its capital to be Baqubah.

In June 2007, US forces launched Operation Arrowhead Ripper with night air assaults in Baqubah. By August 19, Baqubah was largely secured, although some insurgent presence remained in the city and surrounding areas. Fighting continued in the Diyala River valley but by the beginning of October, US and Iraqi forces held most of the province while the insurgents were in retreat to the north and west. On October 27 the Islamic State of Iraq attacked a police base in Baqubah, killing 28 Iraqi policemen and police recruits, showing that insurgent cells still remain in the province.

In January 2008 Operation Phantom Phoenix was launched in an attempt to eradicate the remaining insurgents following the Diyala campaign between 2006 and 2007.

Mid-2008 saw many changes in Diyala province with an increased effort by U.S. Forces and a substantial Iraqi Army presence, and in the Baqubah region, Islamic State of Iraq's activity was dramatically hampered, and the Sons of Iraq program served only to further weaken Islamic State in Iraq.

Declaration of autonomy
In December 2011, the governing council in Diyala province declared itself a semi-autonomous region within Iraq.  This comes two months after Saladin Governorate made a similar declaration. The council in Diyala, using Article 119 of the Iraqi Constitution as justification, made the declaration because of suspicion of the Shi'a-dominated government of Prime Minister Nouri al-Maliki. Unlike Salahuddin province however, Diyala province is more ethnically and religiously mixed, and such an announcement led to the outbreak of protests in the province.

See also 
Hisham al-Hayali, former governor
Battle of Baqubah
2004 Baqubah bombing
15 July 2008 Baquba bombings
15 September 2008 Balad Ruz bombing
23 April 2009 Iraqi suicide attacks
3 March 2010 Baqubah bombings
2014 Musab bin Omair mosque massacre

References 

 
Governorates of Iraq
Upper Mesopotamia